Alihoca is a  village in Ulukışla district of Niğde Province, Turkey. The history of the village hasn't been researched yet, but cuneiform on some rocks around the village implies a deep history. The present population of the village is probably of Central Asian origin. The population of the village is 558 as of 2011.

The main agricultural products are green beans, cherries, grapes, apples, peaches, some cereals and potatoes.

References

Villages in Ulukışla District